José Planas Planas (born 12 April 1952) is a Spanish former professional footballer who played as a midfielder.

Career
Born in Llubí, Planas played for Terrassa, Granada and Sabadell.

References

1952 births
Living people
Spanish footballers
Terrassa FC footballers
Granada CF footballers
CE Sabadell FC footballers
Segunda División players
Association football midfielders